India’s Power Elite is a 2021 political commentary book by Indian policy analyst Sanjaya Baru. The book is a study of the nature of elitism in postcolonial India and focuses on the disruption brought about by the rise of BJP in India after 2014 general elections.

References

2021 non-fiction books
Indian non-fiction books
21st-century Indian literature
Penguin Books India books